The 1902 Haskell Indians football team was an American football team that represented the Haskell Indian Institute (now known as Haskell Indian Nations University) as an independent during the 1902 college football season. Led by first-year head coach John H. Outland, Haskell compiled an 8–2–1 record and outscored opponents by a total of 203 to 79. The team's victories included shutouts against Missouri (40–0), Texas (12–0), and Washington University (18–0); its losses were to Illinois (24–10) and Nebraska (28–0).

Outland was hired as Haskell's coach in February 1902.

Schedule

References

Haskell
Haskell Indian Nations Fighting Indians football seasons
Haskell Indians football